Type Media Center (formerly The Nation Institute) is a nonprofit media organization that was previously associated with The Nation magazine. It sponsors fellows, hosts forums, publishes books and investigative reporting, and awards several annual journalism prizes. Orville Schell worked for the organization, and Katrina vanden Heuvel is currently a member of their board of trustees. 

Type Media Center fellows have included Naomi Klein, Wayne Barrett, Chris Hedges, David Moberg, Jeremy Scahill, and Chris Hayes. The organization has also funded podcasts, short-form broadcast media, and documentaries, including several by Habiba Nosheen.

Type is one of the presenters of the Ridenhour Prizes. It collaborates on the Puffin Prize for Creative Citizenship with the Puffin Foundation. Tom Engelhardt is the creator of the organization's TomDispatch.com, a widely syndicated online blog.

Type started its publishing imprint Bold Type Books (formerly Nation Books) in 2000, in partnership with Thunder's Mouth Press. In 2007, Perseus Books Group acquired Avalon Publishing Group, which was the parent company of Thunder's Mouth Press. Bold Type Books’ current partner imprint is Hachette Book Group.

Type's investigative newsroom, Type Investigations (formerly The Investigative Fund), was founded in 1996. It is known for producing long-form investigations, primarily for national magazines, into abuses of power, inequality, and government malfeasance. Unlike a conventional outlet that maintains its own distribution platform, Type Investigations primarily publishes via partnerships with print, radio, and television outlets. It is one of the only women-led investigative newsrooms among Institute for Nonprofit News member organizations.

In addition to working with freelance reporters, Type Investigations’ past and current reporting fellows have included Nick Turse, Wayne Barrett, Jeremy Scahill, Sharon Lerner, Janine di Giovanni, Lee Fang, Sarah Posner, John Carlos Frey, and Ali Gharib. The project has received four Emmy Awards, three National Magazine Awards, and a Peabody, and a 2019 investigation into the U.S. Department of the Interior prompted a congressional inquiry.

References

External links
 

The Nation
Non-profit organizations based in New York City
Publishing companies established in 2000